Thelosia resputa is a moth species in the family Apatelodidae. It was first described by Max Wilhelm Karl Draudt in 1929 based on a female specimen from the collection of Otto Staudinger held by the Natural History Museum, Berlin. The location where the type specimen was collected is unknown, and the species therefore has no type locality.

Appearance
The moth's appearance is pale yellow-grey forewings with a dense, brown dusting and two faint transverse lines, with a white discal spot between them. The hindwings are a pale ochreous yellow with a weak central spot.

References

Apatelodidae
Moths described in 1929
Taxa named by Max Wilhelm Karl Draudt